The Wild, Wild World of Jayne Mansfield is a 1968 mondo documentary film chronicling the travels of actress Jayne Mansfield. It was directed by Charles W. Broun, Jr., Joel Holt and Arthur Knight.

Synopsis
The Wild, Wild World of Jayne Mansfield began production in 1964 and continued shooting sporadically through 1967 as the budget was limited. The film consists of Mansfield visiting various locations throughout Europe and the United States.
The European footage, shot in Rome and Paris, features Mansfield observing Italian roadside prostitutes, running from the paparazzi and attending the Cannes Film Festival. She is also filmed visiting "unusual" European locations such as a French naturist community, strip clubs, a gay bar and a massage parlor. The footage shot in the United States features Mansfield judging a transvestite beauty pageant in New York City along with footage of dancers at a Los Angeles topless bar. Musical performances by the all-girl topless band The Ladybirds(es) and Rocky Roberts & The Airedales (to which Mansfield does the Twist) are also included. Rounding out the film are clips of Mansfield's nude scenes from the 1963 sex comedy Promises! Promises!, the 1964 Italian film Primitive Love, and shots of her Playboy magazine pictorial.

Production ceased after Mansfield died in a car accident in June 1967. Upon her death, the film's producers added news footage about her death and photographs from the scene of her fatal car accident. The film concludes with a tour of Mansfield's Los Angeles home, the Pink Palace, given by her ex-husband Mickey Hargitay and a video tribute.

Production notes
Working titles for the film include Jayne Mansfield Reports, Mansfield Reports Europe and Mansfield By Night. As the film was edited and released after Mansfield's death, actress Carolyn De Fonseca (who was Mansfield's official voice dubber for European productions) was hired to mimic Mansfield's voice for the narration.

Distributed by Blue Ribbons Pictures, The Wild, Wild World of Jayne Mansfield premiered on April 18, 1968 in New Orleans, Louisiana. It was released with an X rating ("for adults only") due to its adult content and nudity.

Home media
In September 2003, Something Weird Video released The Wild, Wild World of Jayne Mansfield along with another mondo film The Labyrinth Of Sex on Region 1 DVD.

See also
 List of American films of 1968

References

External links
 
 
 
 

1968 films
1968 documentary films
American documentary films
Documentary films about actors
Films shot in Los Angeles
Films shot in Paris
Films shot in Rome
French documentary films
German documentary films
Mondo films
West German films
Jayne Mansfield
1960s English-language films
1960s American films
1960s French films
1960s German films
English-language French films
English-language German films